A rainstick is a long, hollow tube partially filled with small pebbles, rice, dried beans, or other hard granular matter that has small pins or thorns arranged helically on its inside surface. When the stick is upended, the pebbles fall to the other end of the tube, bouncing off the internal protrusions to create a sound reminiscent of falling rain. The rainstick is believed to have been invented by the Mapuche and was played in the belief it could bring about rainstorms. It was also found on the Chilean coasts, though it is not certain if it was made by the Incas. Rainsticks are usually made from any of several species of cactus such as Eulychnia acida and Echinopsis pachanoi. The cacti, which are hollow, are dried in the sun. The spines are removed, then driven into the cactus like nails. Pebbles or other small objects are placed inside the rainstick, and the ends are sealed. A sound like falling water is made when the rainstick has its direction changed to a vertical position.

Similar instruments can also be found in Southeast Asia, Australia and Africa, where it is often made using bamboo rather than dried cactus.

Rainsticks may also be made with other common materials like paper towel rolls instead of cactus, and nails or toothpicks instead of thorns, and they are often sold to tourists visiting parts of Latin America and also the Southwestern United States (which has a history of Spanish and Mexican cultural influence).

Further reading
 Exploratorium Article Make your own rainstick
 "The Rain Stick" https://www.youtube.com/watch?v=3Sb7OfXGhUE
 Moseley, Christine, and Carmen Fies. "Rainsticks: Integrating Culture, Folklore, and the Physics of Sound." Science Activities 44.1 (2007): 2-5. Academic Search Premier. EBSCO. Web. 27 Sept. 2011.
 Nugent, Jeff. "Permaculture Plants, agaves and cacti" SARI Sept 2011

Individual friction vessels
Hand percussion
South American percussion instruments
Unpitched percussion instruments
Toy instruments and noisemakers